Cirat is a municipality of Valencia in the province of Castellón, Spain. It has a population of approximately 240 and is the capital of Alto Mijares.

Sources
Official website

Municipalities in the Province of Castellón